Jar burial is a human burial custom where the corpse is placed into a large earthenware container and then interred. Jar burials are a repeated pattern at a site or within an archaeological culture. When an anomalous burial is found in which a corpse or cremated remains have been interred, it is not considered a "jar burial".

Jar burial can be traced to various regions across the globe. It was practiced as early as 4500 BCE, and as recently as the 15th–17th centuries CE. Areas of jar burial excavations include India, Indonesia, Lebanon, Palestine, Taiwan, Japan, Cambodia, Iran, Syria, Sumatra, Egypt, Malaysia, the Philippines, Thailand, Vanuatu, and Vietnam. These different locations had different methods, accoutrements, and rationales behind their jar burial practices. Cultural practices included primary versus secondary burial, burial offerings (bronze or iron tools and weapons; bronze, silver, or gold ornaments; wood, stone, clay, glass, paste) in or around burials, and social structures represented in the location and method of jar placement.

Among many cultures, a period of waiting occurs between the first burial and a second burial which often coincides with the duration of decomposition. The origin of this practice is considered to be the different concepts of death held by these cultures. In such societies, death is held to involve a slow change, a passage from the visible society of the living to the invisible one of the dead. During the period of decomposition, the corpse is sometimes treated as if it were alive, provided with food and drink, and surrounded by company. For example, some groups on the island of Borneo attach mystical importance to the disintegration of the body, sometimes collecting and carefully disposing of the liquids produced by decomposition.

Methods
The custom of jar burial was employed by peoples who chose this practice for primary or secondary burial. Primary burial refers to the acts performed on the body immediately after death. In some cases, primary jar burial was more difficult to carry out. In Cretan societies, the dead body would be bound tightly to fit into the desired jar. This was believed to be originally intended for infants and small children, but evolved to include larger categories of adults. Adult burial, however, required much larger jars, deeper graves, and more manpower. In Egyptian societies, the body also could be sat upright, and then the jar would be forced on top of the body. Egyptians also would place the body into the jar themselves, rather than pushing the jar downwards, but this would create a need for a lid. Lids were not always ceramic; some have been found to be as simple as a rock or another jar. It seems the preference of how the body was placed did not have any particular significance.

Secondary burials are performed on bodies that has already been buried. The allotted time between primary and secondary burials varies between cultures; however, an emphasis is placed on waiting until the body has decomposed, and thus whatever technique is carried out as "secondary" concerns only bones lacking flesh. In this type of jar burial, the bones (flesh removed) were cleaned and subsequently put in a jar.

Jar additions
Types of jars and additional components vary between locations and cultures. Jars shapes can indicate the prestige or social level of the deceased; or it can simply be a commonplace jar. Funerary offerings are sometimes placed in or around the jars, revealing more information about the value people attributed to certain items.

Decoration
In ancient Greece, pithoi were typical storage jars, and were commonly used for burials. They have vertical round-to-oval handles. Carvings on jars have also been found, sometimes depicting local divine beings of the time. This is thought to have assisted in the individual's passage to the afterlife. The carvings on jars are not standardized, meaning there is no particular pattern of a certain carving on multiple jars. Most carvings have been observed in Egypt.

Some jars are specifically manufactured for jar burials, due to the varying size of bodies and grave sites available to different cultures.

Accoutrements
Many jar burial sites are accompanied by more than just the skeletons and jars. Beads, swords, mirrors, and other animal bones have been found in and around jars. In the Cardamom Mountains, a large number of beads have been found in jars. These are most likely offerings to the deceased, in the same way that tombs have gifts in them. The presence of these beads and other offerings gives great insight into the lifestyle of the people. By studying the materials and methods the beads were made of, researchers have been able to link various cultures together based on their likely trade operations—how they obtained exotic beads beyond what was typical of their own culture.

Gallery

Geographical locations

See also
 Canopic jar
 Plain of Jars
 Hanging coffins

References

Sources 
 
 
 
 

Archaeological features
Death customs